Constitution Square (Ploshcha Konstytutsii) is a square restricted to pedestrians only and located in the very center of Kyiv city, Pechersk neighborhood of the Pechersk Raion.

Constitution Square
The square is elongated stretching from vulytsia Mykhaila Hrushevskoho (Hrushevsky Street) towards the Dnieper's sloping banks. On a northern side of the square is located an ensemble of two government buildings consisting of Verkhovna Rada building and Mariinskyi Palace, while on its southern side is located Mariinskyi Park. Just pass the Palace, the Constitution Square ends.

The square was known since building of the Palace back in 1750. Until 1854 here were located administrative buildings, taking place military parades, training, etc. Already in 1847 next to it was established Mariinskyi Park. In 1869 appears the first recorded name for the square - Dvortsovskaya ploshchad (Palace Square).

Sometime in 1930s the square changed its name to TsVK USSR Square (after the Central Executive Committee of Ukraine), while already in 1940 it was renamed into the October Square. After the World War II it was known as the Verkhovna Rada Square. And finally in 1977 the square reached its apotheosis in naming as the Soviet Square.

After the fall of the Soviet Union, the authorities were not in a hurry to get rid of such name. It was not until 2012 when the square was officially and legally renamed to its current name, the Constitution Square.

References

Further reading
 Syhalov, A. Kiev streets, handbook. Ed.2. "Reklama". Kiev 1979.
 Muzhylko, O. Kyiv streets: old and new names. "Buzhany". Kyiv 2010. .
 Kudrytskyi, A. Kyiv: Encyclopedic handbook. "Ukrainian Soviet Encyclopedia". Kyiv 1982.

Squares in Kyiv
Hrushevsky Street (Kyiv)